Amy Chan Sau-man (陳秀雯) is a Hong Kong actress and Cantopop singer, notable for starring in the File of Justice TV franchise in the 1990s. She is also the elder sister of actress Charine Chan (陳加玲).

Filmography

Films

Television

External links 

1962 births
Living people
Hong Kong film actresses
Hong Kong television actresses